The 2013 Copa Centroamericana was the 12th Copa Centroamericana, the regional championship for men's national association football teams in Central America. It was organized by the Unión Centroamericana de Fútbol or UNCAF, and took place in Costa Rica from 18 January to 27 January 2013. The top five teams go on to participate in the 2013 CONCACAF Gold Cup.

The tournament consisted of two stages. In the group stage of the tournament finals, the seven teams competed for points in two round-robin groups, one of four teams and the other of three, with the top two teams in each group proceeding. These four teams advanced to the semi-final stage, with the winners advancing to the final, while the losers contested a third-place match. The fifth-place match was played between the third-ranked teams from the group stage.

In the final, Costa Rica defeated defending champions Honduras 1–0, with Giancarlo González's goal in the 38th minute giving Costa Rica their seventh Central American title; they also became the first host nation to win the tournament since Costa Rica did it in 1999. The final between Costa Rica and Honduras, being the fifth time the two teams have contested final together, became the most frequent match-up at that stage. Belize made history in this tournament by managing to advance to the semifinals and qualifying to compete in the CONCACAF Gold Cup for the first time.

Participating nations
All seven UNCAF members participated in the tournament:

Venue
All matches were played at Estadio Nacional in San José, built as a replacement for the original National Stadium and opened in 2011.

Squads

Group stage
The group stage draw was held in San José on October 9, 2012.

Tiebreakers
Greater number of points in matches between the tied teams.
Greater goal difference in matches between the tied teams (if more than two teams finish equal on points).
Greater number of goals scored in matches among the tied teams (if more than two teams finish equal on points).
Greater goal difference in all group matches.
Greater number of goals scored in all group matches.
Drawing of lots.

All times local (UTC−06:00).

Group A

Group B

El Salvador and Panama finished with identical records and so their positions were determined by drawing of lots. El Salvador won and was placed second.

Final stage
In case of tie, no extra time is played, and the match is decided by a penalty shoot-out.

Fifth place match

Semifinals

Third place match

Final

Awards

Golden Ball
  Patrick Pemberton
Golden Boot
  Jairo Arrieta (2 goals)
Golden Glove
  Patrick Pemberton

Goalscorers
2 goals
 Jairo Arrieta
1 goal

 Trevor Lennen
 Deon McCaulay
 Celso Borges
 Giancarlo González
 Cristian Lagos
 Rodney Wallace
 Nelson Bonilla
 Rafael Burgos
 José Manuel Contreras
 David Espinoza
 Minor López
 Brayan Beckeles
 Jerry Bengtson
 Juan Pablo Montes
 Elvis Figueroa
 Josue Quijano
 Blas Pérez
 Alberto Quintero
 Alcibíades Rojas
 Marcos Sánchez

Final standings

References

External links
 Copa Centroamericana, UNCAF.net
 Copa Centroamericana, CONCACAF.com
Results from CONCACAF
 Official Facebook page

 
2013 in Central American football
2011
2013
2012–13 in Salvadoran football
2012–13 in Costa Rican football
2012–13 in Honduran football
2012–13 in Guatemalan football
2012–13 in Nicaraguan football
2012–13 in Panamanian football
2012–13 in Belizean football